Dušan Jovanović (1 October 1939 – 1 January 2021) was a Slovene theatre director, playwright and essayist, known for his experimental and grotesque satirical theatre. Since 2005 he was also the president of the Prešeren Foundation.

Jovanović was born in Belgrade in 1939, just before the outbreak of the Second World War. After the war he moved to Ljubljana with his father and went on to study English and French at the University of Ljubljana and also graduated in stage direction from the Academy for Theatre, Radio, Film and Television. In the late 1960s and 1970s he participated in numerous experimental theatre groups and was artistic director at the Mladinsko Theatre between 1978 and 1985. Since 1989 he was also assistant professor at the Academy for Theatre, Radio, Film and Television. He was also author of numerous film and TV scripts.

Since the late 1990s Jovanović became also an acclaimed columnist and essayist. In 2008 he received the Rožanc Award for his essay collection Svet je drama (The World is a Drama).

Published works

Prose 
 Don Juan na psu ali Zdrav duh v zdravem telesu, 1969

Plays 
 Predstave ne bo, 1963
 Norci, 1968
 Znamke, nakar še Emilija, 1969
 Igrajte tumor v glavi in onesnaževanje zraka, 1971
 Življenje podeželskih plejbojev po drugi svetovni vojni ali tuje hočemo, svojega ne damo, 1972
 Žrtve mode bum bum, 1975
 Generacije, 1977
 Vojaška skrivnost, 1983
 Osvoboditev Skopja, 1977
 Karamazovi, 1980
 Viktor ali dan mladosti, 1989
 Jasnovidka ali Dan mrtvih, 1989
 Zid, jezero, 1989
 Antigona, 1996
 Uganka korajže, 1994
 Kdo to poje Sizifa, 1997
 Karajan C/Klinika Kozarcky/Ekshibicionist, 1999
 Ekshibicionist, under the pseudonym O. J. Traven, 2001

Essay collections 
 Paberki, 1996
 Moški, ženska, 2000
 Sobotna knjiga, 2005
 Svet je drama, 2007

References

External links
 

1939 births
2021 deaths
Slovenian theatre directors
Slovenian dramatists and playwrights
Slovenian essayists
University of Ljubljana alumni
Slovenian people of Serbian descent
Theatre people from Belgrade